Yeoman Credit Racing was a name used by two different Formula One motor racing teams in the early-1960s: the British Racing Partnership (1960); and Reg Parnell Racing (1961–62). The name was derived from commercial sponsorship arrangements, the first time that a Formula One racing team had changed their name in deference to sponsorship.

Brief history
The first team to benefit from this commercial relationship was the British Racing Partnership, run by Ken Gregory and Alfred Moss, who were sponsored by Yeoman Credit Ltd. from August 1959. Yeoman Credit was a finance company founded by Joseph Samengo-Turner in the mid-1950s. By 1959/60 the company was being run by Joseph's sons Paul, William and Fabian. With an expanding business in financing retail motor sales, the Samengo-Turner brothers were looking at new ways of advertising Yeoman Credit. This led to a meeting with Ken Gregory of the British Racing Partnership, which resulted in the formation of the first fully sponsored Formula One Grand Prix Team – giving Yeoman Credit the opportunity to secure profile advertising in the press and on television.

Initially the team entered Formula Two, with only occasional Formula One races, but in  they made the step to concentrate on a three-car Formula One team running 1959 Cooper T51s, with mixed success. Unfortunately, during this time two of the team's drivers (Harry Schell and Chris Bristow) were killed while racing their cars.

In September 1960 the Yeoman Credit Racing identity and sponsorship funds were moved by the Samengo-Turner brothers to the newly formed Reg Parnell Racing team, as relations between BRP and Yeoman Credit had broken down. BRP had to find a new sponsor and sourced new funding from the United Dominions Trust, a competitor of Yeoman Credit in the financing of retail motor sales. The Yeoman Credit team continued, now in its new dark-blue-and-red liveried Cooper T53s, during . Despite a good start to the season with John Surtees winning the Glover Trophy at Goodwood (the first 1.5 litre non-championship Formula One race), results did not come as expected.

Bowmaker Racing

For  the Yeoman Credit's parent company, Bowmaker Limited, decided that the team's name should be changed to Bowmaker Racing. The team decided to invest in a new car which was commissioned from Eric Broadley's Lola Cars company and was the first Formula One design to emerge from the Lola stable. However, Broadley's Lola Mk4 cars did not prove as competitive as had been hoped. Despite full works support from the Lola factory and pole position for their first race, the Dutch Grand Prix, Bowmaker withdrew their financial support before the start of the 1963 Formula One season. Reg Parnell Racing survived the loss of funds, and the death of owner Reg Parnell himself in 1964, and eventually merged with the British Racing Motors works team in the late 1960s.

Complete Formula One World Championship results
(key)

References
Bowmaker Racing. Bowmaker Limited, Bournemouth. pp. 15 (1962 promotional booklet.)

Formula One entrants
British auto racing teams